Sumner-Fredericksburg Community School District (SFCSD) is a school district headquartered in Iowa, serving Sumner and Fredericksburg and the surrounding rural areas. It spans sections of Bremer, Chickasaw, and Fayette counties.

It was established on July 1, 2014, as a merger of the Sumner Community School District and Fredericksburg Community School District, which already shared schools together as part of a whole grade-sharing agreement. The merger was approved by an election scheduled on Tuesday February 5, 2013, by 728–25 in the Sumner district and 432–184 in the Federicksburg district.

During a two-year period after the merger, two area education agencies, Area Education Agency 267, which served the previous Sumner district, Keystone Area Education Agency (AEA 1), which served the previous Fredericksburg district, worked together to oversee the newly merged district. After the transition period, only AEA 267 was to oversee the merged district.

Schools
 Sumner-Fredericksburg High School (Sumner)
 Sumner-Fredericksburg Middle School (Fredericksburg)
 Durant Elementary School (Sumner)
 Federicksburg Elementary School (Fredericksburg)

The Sumner-Fredericksburg Middle School is located in the former Fredericksburg High School building.

See also
List of school districts in Iowa

References

External links
 Sumner-Fredericksburg Community School District

School districts in Iowa
2014 establishments in Iowa
School districts established in 2014
Education in Bremer County, Iowa
Education in Chickasaw County, Iowa
Education in Fayette County, Iowa